The Mechanized Brigade or BrigMec is a mechanized infantry brigade in service with the Portuguese Army.

History 
The 3rd Infantry Division (3ª Divisão de Infantaria or Divisão Nun´Álvares) was created and assigned to NATO in 1953.

The Nun Alvares Division adopted an almost totally U.S. organization (and equipment), including around 20,000 men, with three infantry regiments (each reinforced with a squadron of tanks), a divisional tank battalion, three field artillery battalions and anti-aircraft, engineering, signal and logistical units. To serve as a training base for the division, the large Santa Margarida Military Camp was built. As the Nun'Álvares Division started to be mainly maintained by the 3rd Military Region (headquartered in Tomar), from 1955, it began to be officially designated as the 3rd Division.

In 1960 the "Nun Alvares" Division's organization was changed from three tactical groupings, based on infantry regiments, to three LANDCENT-type infantry brigades. In 1961 the 3rd Division organized its last large maneuvers. From 1961, the Portuguese Army's effort focused primarily on the Overseas War, with the division entering a decline.

In 1968–1976, studies were carried out to update Portugal's ground contribution to NATO for a force of different characteristics from the 3rd Division. This took form with the 1st Independent Composite Brigade (1ª Brigada Mista Independente, 1ª BMI), established in 1976. After the end of the Cold War, the brigade was redesignated the Independent Mechanized Brigade (Brigada Mecanizada Independente), which then became the Mechanized Brigade in 2006.

List of units 

The Mechanized Brigade differs from the army's other two brigades as its units aren't provided by regiments. All units of the Mechanized Brigade are part of the Mechanized Brigade at all times and are all based at the Santa Margarida Camp. The following units are part of the Mechanized Brigade:

 Mechanized Brigade, in Santa Margarida
 Command and Services Company (Companhia de Comando e Serviços)
 Tank Group, (Grupo de Carros de Combate) with two squadrons of Leopard 2 A6
 Mechanized Infantry Battalion, (Batalhão de Infantaria Mecanizado) with M113A1/A2 armored personnel carrier
 Field Artillery Group, (Grupo de Artilharia de Campanha or GAC) with M109A5 155mm self-propelled howitzers
 Reconnaissance Squadron, (Esquadrão de Reconhecimento or ERec) with Leopard 2 A6 and M901 ITV tank destroyers
 Anti-Aircraft Artillery Battery, (Bateria de Artilharia Anti-Aérea or BtrAAA) with MIM-72A3 Chaparral surface-to-air missiles
 Engineer Company, (Companhia de Engenharia Combate Pesado or CEngCombPes) with M60 AVLB
 Signal Company, (Companhia de Transmissões or CTms)
 Combat Service Support Battalion, (Batalhão de Apoio de Serviços or BApSvc)

Equipment

References

External links 
 Official site of the brigade
Mechanised brigades
Military units and formations established in 2006
Military of Portugal
Brigades of Portugal